Gisela is the name of:

People

Full name

 Gisela, Abbess of Chelles (757–810), daughter of Pepin the Short, sister of Charlemagne
 Gisela, daughter of Charlemagne (781–808)
 Gisela, daughter of Louis the Pious (born 821), consort of Eberhard of Friuli
 Gisela of France, also Gisella or Giséle (fl. 911), traditionally, a daughter to the king of France, Charles the Simple and a consort of Rollo
 Gisela of Burgundy (c. 975 – 21 July 1006), daughter of Conrad, king of Burgundy
 Gisela of Hungary (c. 985 - 7 May 1065), her daughter
 Gisela of Swabia (989 or 990 – 14 February 1043), Holy Roman Empress, wife of Conrad II, Holy Roman Emperor
 Archduchess Gisela of Austria (12 July 1856 – 27 July 1932), daughter to Emperor Franz Joseph I of Austria and Elisabeth of Bavaria, named after Giselle of Bavaria
 Gisela (singer) (born January 1, 1979), a Spanish singer

Given name
 Gisela (name)

Other
 Gisela, Arizona, a US census-designated place
 Gisela (magazine)

es:Gisela